A labour council, trades council or industrial council is an association of labour unions or union branches in a given area. Most commonly, they represent unions in a given geographical area, whether at the district, city, region, or provincial or state level. They may also be based on a particular industry rather than geographical area, as for example, in the Maritime Council of Australia which co-ordinated the waterfront and maritime unions involved in the 1890 Australian Maritime Dispute.

Affiliates of labour councils are trade union branches or locals, and occasionally other labour movement organisations. Citywide or provincial councils may have district or regional labour council affiliates as well as trade unions. Some labour councils restrict their membership to organisations  which are affiliated with a particular national trade union federation, such as many state-level labour councils in the United States, which are chartered from the AFL–CIO national confederation.

Finances are usually obtained through an affiliation fee, often based on a per capita tax on the membership of affiliates. In Australia, Trades and Labour Councils often have their own hall and offices known as a Trades Hall, with the term Trades Hall often used as a colloquial expression for the Labour Council or Trades Hall Council.

Note on usage
Labour councils are a widespread phenomenon, but are given different names in different English-speaking areas. Labour Council is most common in Canada and Australia, Labor Council is used in the (USA) and Trades Council, Trades Union Council or Trades and Labour Council in the United Kingdom (and until recently was widespread in Australia) and some other countries. Another term sometimes used is Industrial Council, as in for example, the Barrier Industrial Council of Broken Hill in Australia.

National associations of trade unions, such as British Trade Union Congress may also be considered a labour council, though the term often implies a primarily local organisation.

History
Labour Councils were formed to meet a need to co-ordinate trade union activity in a geographical region. The earliest examples of this form of organisation can be found in the medieval craft guilds and Craft halls that developed in European cities. An example of this is the historic Glasgow Trades Hall wherein the 14 Incorporated Trades of Hammermen, Tailors, Cordiners, Maltmen, Weavers, Bakers, Skinners, Wrights, Coopers, Fleshers, Masons, Gardeners, Barbers, Bonnetmakers & Dyers yearly elected members of the Trades House, headed by the Deacon Convener of the Trades:

The Trades House of Glasgow was created at the time of reform of Glasgow's local government in 1605. At that time the electorate was basically divided into two groups, the Merchants and the Craftsmen. The Craft Incorporations or Guilds comprised the trades Rank of Burgesses under the leadership of the deacon convener, who was given a council. This included the Craft leaders and is the body we now recognise as the Trades House.

The trade union activity of the late nineteenth century in particular spurred the establishment of Labour Councils and Trades Councils acrossing North America, Australia and Britain.

Some notable events in the history of labour councils include:

 1791–1794 – Glasgow Trades Hall built to serve as a public hall and meeting place for the city's Trades House and 14 Incorporated Crafts
 1834 – attempt to establish the Grand National Consolidated Trades Union in Britain
 1848 – first Liverpool Trades Council founded
 1856 – Melbourne Trades Hall Committee formed. Now known as Victorian Trades Hall Council
 1858 – Sheffield Trades Council and Glasgow Trades Council founded
 1859 – Melbourne Trades Hall opened in May.  Edinburgh Trades Council and Bolton Trades Council founded
 1860 – London Trades Council and Leeds Trades Council founded
 1861 – Dundee Trades Union Council founded
 1864 – Manchester and Salford Trades Council formed.
 1868 – First Trades Union Congress called by Manchester and Salford Trades Council in Manchester, with invitations being sent to  "trades councils and other similar federations of trade societies" only.
 1871 – Trades & Labor Council of Sydney formed.
 1871 - Toronto Trades and Labour Assembly (now the Toronto and York Labour Council) formed
 1893 – San Francisco Labor Council chartered.
 1895 – Trades Union Congress (Britain) restricted to unions, with trades councils excluded altogether to avoid dual representation.
 1926 – In Britain, Trades Councils play a prominent role in organising the General Strike

See also

 Bourses du travail in France
 Trades Hall
 Trade union
 National trade union centre (or labour federation)
 Labour history

References

External links
 Glasgow Trades Hall history
 What is a trade union council? Greater London Association of Trade Union Councils
 Trades Union Councils by the British Trade Union Congress
 Catalogue of the Coventry Trades Council archives, held at the Modern Records Centre, University of Warwick
 Catalogue of the trades council publications collection, held at the Modern Records Centre, University of Warwick

Labor relations